David Ferrer won the tournament winning the final against the defending champion Nicolás Almagro by 4–6, 6–3, 6–2.

Seeds

Draw

Finals

Top half

Bottom half

Qualifying

Seeds

Qualifiers

Draw

First qualifier

Second qualifier

Third qualifier

Fourth qualifier

External links
 Main draw
 Qualifying draw

Copa Claro - Singles
2012 Singles